Sander Armée (born 10 December 1985) is a Belgian former professional road racing cyclist, who competed as a professional from 2010 to 2022.

Biography

Childhood and amateur career 
Born in Leuven, Flanders, Armée participated in athletics, cycling, and skating during his childhood. In 2007, he was recruited by the Belgian continental cycling team Profel Ziegler. He won five races in 2007 and six in 2008.

Professional career 
Armée became a professional rider in 2010, signing for the professional continental team . He placed seventh in the Star Bessèges and nineteenth in the Tour of Belgium.

After four years with the team, Armée joined  for the 2014 season. He remained with the team until the end of the 2020 season, before joining .

Major results

2007
 2nd Circuit de Wallonie
 6th Ronde van Vlaanderen U23
2008
 4th Memorial Van Coningsloo
 8th Flèche Ardennaise
 9th Circuit de Wallonie
2009
 1st Kattekoers
 1st Flèche Ardennaise
 7th Overall Tour de Bretagne
1st Stages 4 & 7
2010
 7th Overall Étoile de Bessèges
2012
 4th Overall Tour of Norway
 10th Druivenkoers Overijse
2013
 3rd Omloop van het Waasland
 5th Grand Prix d'Ouverture La Marseillaise
 6th Volta Limburg Classic
 8th Overall Vuelta a Andalucía
2016
 1st  Mountains classification Tour de Romandie
 5th Overall Tour of Norway
2017
 Vuelta a España
1st Stage 18
 Combativity award Stage 15
 1st  Mountains classification Tour de Romandie
 2nd Overall Four Days of Dunkirk
 4th Overall Tour of Norway
2019
 9th Overall Tour of Norway
2020
 1st Stage 3a Tour Poitou-Charentes en Nouvelle-Aquitaine
 5th Trofeo Serra de Tramuntana

Grand Tour general classification results timeline

References

External links 

1985 births
Living people
Belgian male cyclists
Sportspeople from Leuven
Cyclists from Flemish Brabant
Belgian Vuelta a España stage winners